Theodoric III of Isenburg-Kempenich (German: Dietrich III. von Isenburg-Kempenich) was a Lord of Isenburg-Kempenich co-ruling with his uncles Florentin and Theodoric II.

Theodoric was a son of Salentin of Isenburg-Kempenich who co-ruled with his brothers. After Salentin's death, Theodoric became a co-ruler with his uncles. Theodoric eventually outlived his uncles. He was succeeded by his son Gerard I.

House of Isenburg
Year of birth unknown
Year of death unknown